Dustmurod Aliev (formerly Jamoat Fayzobod) is a jamoat in Tajikistan. It is located in Fayzobod District, one of the Districts of Republican Subordination. The jamoat has a total population of 13,164 (2015).

References

Populated places in Districts of Republican Subordination
Jamoats of Tajikistan